Giancarlo González Castro (born 8 February 1988) is a Costa Rican professional footballer who plays as a centre-back for Liga FPD club Alajuelense and the Costa Rica national team.

Club career

Early career
González spent his youth career with Alajuelense, apart from a stint with Saprissa when he was between 12 and 14 years of age. He began his professional career with Alajuelense in 2007 and was a key player in helping his club win three league titles.

González joined Norwegian club Vålerenga after his contract expired on 31 July 2012. During his time at Vålerenga, González appeared in 37 league matches and scored two goals.

Columbus Crew
On 21 February 2014, González signed with Major League Soccer side Columbus Crew. On 15 April 2014, the MLS Disciplinary Committee fined González an undisclosed amount for "embellishment" of an incident in the 92nd minute of the game against the San Jose Earthquakes on 13 April. González was also nominated for the satirical "Fallon d'Floor" award for this effort.

Palermo
After his performances at the 2014 FIFA World Cup, González received interest from a number of European clubs, and on 26 August 2014 Palermo of Italy's Serie A confirmed they had signed him on a three-year deal. The transfer fee was reported to be $5 million, with 5% of the fee being distributed among González's youth clubs Alajuelense and Saprissa as per the FIFA solidarity contribution rules. He made his debut on 19 October 2014 in a home game against Cesena, playing the full 90 minutes and scoring the winning goal in the first minute of injury time.

Palermo's 2016–17 season ended in relegation from Serie A, with González making 21 appearances.

Bologna
On 22 June 2017, Bologna announced the signing of González.

LA Galaxy 
On 11 April 2019, González signed with the LA Galaxy.

International career
González played at the 2007 FIFA U-20 World Cup held in Canada.

Nicknamed Pipo, he made his senior international debut for Costa Rica in a friendly against Slovakia on 5 June 2010. In January 2013, he scored the lone goal in a 1–0 victory over Honduras in the 2013 Copa Centroamericana final.

2014 World Cup
In June 2014, González was named in Costa Rica's squad for the 2014 FIFA World Cup. In the team's first two group matches, he and his central defensive colleagues Michael Umaña and Óscar Duarte allowed only one goal as Los Ticos beat Uruguay (3–1) and Italy (1–0) to qualify for the knockout stage. Costa Rica completed the group stage unbeaten, recording a second consecutive shutout in a 0–0 draw with England in Belo Horizonte. González's play at the back was listed by several as key to the team's progression from the group stage. His countless interceptions and tackles led to him being named to the ESPN Best XI of the group stage. During the round of 16, González was the third of five Costa Rican players to successfully convert his kick in a 5–3 penalty shootout defeat of Greece. He was included in the BBC's team of the tournament.

2018 World Cup
In May 2018 he was named in Costa Rica's 23 man squad for the 2018 FIFA World Cup in Russia.

Personal life
González is of Spanish origin. He is a son of Roberto González and Elsa Castro and has a sister and brother. He has a son.

Career statistics

Club

International
Statistics accurate as of match played 21 August 2021.

International goals
Scores and results list Costa Rica's goal tally first.

Honours
Alajuelense
 Liga FPD: Apertura 2010, Clausura 2011, Apertura 2011

Costa Rica
 Copa Centroamericana: 2013

Individual
 CONCACAF Best XI: 2015

References

External links

1988 births
Living people
People from San José Province
Association football defenders
Costa Rican footballers
Costa Rica international footballers
Costa Rica under-20 international footballers
L.D. Alajuelense footballers
Vålerenga Fotball players
Columbus Crew players
Palermo F.C. players
Bologna F.C. 1909 players
LA Galaxy players
Costa Rican people of Spanish descent
Liga FPD players
Eliteserien players
Major League Soccer players
Serie A players
Costa Rican expatriate footballers
Expatriate soccer players in the United States
Expatriate footballers in Norway
Expatriate footballers in Italy
Costa Rican expatriate sportspeople in the United States
Costa Rican expatriate sportspeople in Italy
Costa Rican expatriate sportspeople in Norway
Copa Centroamericana-winning players
2013 Copa Centroamericana players
2013 CONCACAF Gold Cup players
2014 FIFA World Cup players
2015 CONCACAF Gold Cup players
2017 CONCACAF Gold Cup players
2018 FIFA World Cup players
2019 CONCACAF Gold Cup players
2021 CONCACAF Gold Cup players